Urbano Romanelli (c. 1645–1682) was an Italian painter of the Baroque period.

He was born in Viterbo, the son of the painter, Giovanni Francesco Romanelli. After his father died, he entered the studio of Ciro Ferri in Rome. He painted in Rome and in churches at Velletri and Viterbo.

References

1640s births
1682 deaths
People from the Province of Viterbo
17th-century Italian painters
Italian male painters
Italian Baroque painters